Christian Groß (born 8 February 1989) is a German professional footballer who plays as a defensive midfielder or centre back for Werder Bremen.

Career statistics

References

External links
 
 

1989 births
Living people
German footballers
Footballers from Bremen
Association football midfielders
Germany youth international footballers
Bundesliga players
2. Bundesliga players
3. Liga players
Regionalliga players
Hamburger SV II players
Hamburger SV players
SV Babelsberg 03 players
Sportfreunde Lotte players
VfL Osnabrück players
SV Werder Bremen II players
SV Werder Bremen players